Jason De Carteret, born on the British island of Guernsey, is a polar explorer. He took part in the Ice Challenger Expedition and holds (or has held) skiing and vehicle world records for polar exploration. He has worked as a commercial helicopter pilot.

He has also travelled to both Poles by skiing.

Personal life
On 11 November 2015 De Carteret married Dr Eva Carneiro.

See also
 Todd Carmichael

References

Further reading

External links
  (article and audio interview)

Living people
Explorers of Antarctica
Jason
Year of birth missing (living people)